Under Cover 2 is the 5th solo album of Joe Lynn Turner released in 1999. Just like Under Cover, the album consists mainly of covers of Turner's favorite artists. Due to successful sales of the previous edition, the label asked him to record a follow-up. "The Race Is On" is a re-recorded version of a song that appeared on Turner's solo debut album, Rescue You.

"Lost in Hollywood" was recorded as a tribute to the late Cozy Powell who died in a car crash in 1998.

Track listing

Personnel
Joe Lynn Turner: Lead vocals, Backing vocals on 5, 7, 10
Tony Bruno: Guitars
Greg Smith: Bass
Paul Morris: Keyboards
Kenny Kramme: Drums

Guest Guitars

Akira Kajiyama: Guitar on 1, 10, 11
Jeff Golub: Guitar on 2
Vernon Reid: Guitar on 3
Goodfrey Townsend: Guitar on 6
Rick Derringer: Guitar on 7
Leslie West: Guitar on 12
Al Pitrelli: Guitar on 13

Backing Vocals

Steve Murphy: Backing vocals on 3, 5
Evan Slamka: Backing vocals on 3, 5, 10
Eric Miranda: Backing vocals on 3, 5, 10
Bill Snodgrass: Backing vocals on 3
Nancy Bender: Backing vocals on 7
Dina Miller: Backing vocals on 7

References

Joe Lynn Turner albums
1999 albums
Shrapnel Records albums
Covers albums